Jill is an English feminine given name, a short form of the name  Jillian (Gillian), which in turn originates as a Middle English variant of Juliana, the feminine form of the name Julian.

People with the given name
Jill Astbury, Australian researcher into violence against women
Jill Balcon (1925–2009), British actress
 Jill S. Barnholtz-Sloan, American biostatistician and data scientist 
 Jill Becker, American psychological researcher
 Jill Biden (born 1951), American educator and the First Lady of the United States
 Jill E. Brown (born 1950), African American aviator
 Jill Carroll (born 1977), American journalist
 Jill Clayburgh (1944–2010), American actress
 Jill Costello (1987–2010), American athlete and lung cancer activist
 Jill Craigie (1911–1999), British film director and writer
 Jill Craybas (born 1974), American tennis player
 Jill Dando (1961–1999), British television presenter
 Jill Dickman, Republican member of the Nevada Assembly
 Jill Duggar (born 1991), reality TV personality
 Jill Fisch, American professor at the University of Pennsylvania Law School
 Jill Frappier (born 1944), British voice actress
 Jill Gascoine (1937−2020), English actress and novelist
 Jill Gibbon, British artist
 Jill Green, American dance educator and scholar
 Jill Goodacre (born 1964), American model and actress
 Jill Harris, American voice actress
 Jill Hennessy (born 1968), Canadian actress and musician
 Jill Ireland (1936–1990), British actress
 Jill Johnson (born 1973), Swedish singer
 Jill Knight (1923–2022), British politician
 Jill Koshiol, American cancer epidemiologist 
 Jill Martin (1938–2016), English musical theatre actress
 Jill Mellick, Jungian-oriented clinical psychologist
Jill Morris (born 1967), British diplomat
 Jill Murphy (1949–2021), English writer and illustrator
 Jill P. Carter (born 1964), American politician
 Jill Scott (born 1972), American soul singer
 Jill St. John (born 1940), American actress
 Jill Talley (born 1962), American voice actress
 Jill Vidal, Hong Kong singer
 Jill Wagner (born 1979), American actress
 Jill Paton Walsh (1937–2020), English novelist and children's writer
 Jill Zarin, American television personality
 Jill Zimmerman (born 1959), computer scientist and professor at Goucher College

Fictional characters
 Jill, a character in the nursery rhyme "Jack and Jill"
 Jill Foster Abbott, a character on the soap opera The Young and the Restless
 Jill Andersen, Riley's mother during the events of Disney Pixar's Inside Out. Of note is that she is not named in the film itself, but rather in supplementary material.
 Genocide Jill, a serial killer and the alternate personality of Toko Fukawa from the Danganronpa series
 Jillian "Jill" Mastrano Dragomir, a character from Richelle Mead's Bloodlines (book series)
 Jill Masterson, from Goldfinger
 Jill Pembroke, a character in the American sitcom television series Charles in Charge
 Jill Pole, a main character in C.S. Lewis' The Chronicles of Narnia: The Silver Chair
 Jill Valentine, a character from the Resident Evil video games series
 Jill, a character in Katharine Kerr's Deverry Cycle book series

Jill as middle name
 Amy-Jill Levine (born 1956), feminist theology professor
 J. Jill Suitor, sociology professor
 Suzanne Jill Levine (born 1946), American poet and translator

English feminine given names
English given names